Erica hirtiflora, the hairy-flower heath, is a species of Erica that was naturally restricted to the south-western corner of the Western Cape, South Africa around the city of Cape Town.

It produces flowers at any time of year - and in such quantities that the whole bush turns pink. Consequently, it is becoming a popular ornamental plant for Capetonian gardens.

References

hirtiflora
Endemic flora of South Africa
Flora of the Cape Provinces
Natural history of Cape Town